TIM, or thioisomescaline, is a series of lesser-known psychedelic drugs similar in structure to mescaline. They were first synthesized by Alexander Shulgin. In his book PiHKAL (Phenethylamines i Have Known And Loved), none of their durations are known.  Very little is known about their dangers or toxicity.

TIM compounds

2-TIM
Dosage: 240 mg or greater

Duration: unknown

Effects: Few to none, possible boosting of alcohol

3-TIM
Dosage: 240 mg or greater

Duration: unknown

Effects: Few to none

4-TIM
Dosage: 160 mg or greater

Duration: unknown

Effects: Few to none

See also 

 Phenethylamine
 Psychedelics, dissociatives and deliriants
 PiHKAL
 Mescaline
 Isomescaline

External links 
 2-TIM entry in PiHKAL
 2-TIM entry in PiHKAL • info
 3-TIM entry in PiHKAL
 3-TIM entry in PiHKAL • info
 4-TIM entry in PiHKAL
 4-TIM entry in PiHKAL • info

Psychedelic phenethylamines